Bruno Kuzuhara was the reigning champion but decided to participate in the men's singles qualifying as a wild card, where he lost to Michael Mmoh in the first round.

Alexander Blockx won the title, defeating Learner Tien in the final, 6–1, 2–6, 7–6(11–9).

Seeds

Main draw

Finals

Top half

Section 1

Section 2

Bottom half

Section 3

Section 4

Qualifying

Seeds

Qualifiers

Draw

First qualifier

Second qualifier

Third qualifier

Fourth qualifier

Fifth qualifier

Sixth qualifier

Seventh qualifier

Eighth qualifier

References

External links 
 Draw at ITFtennis.com
  at ausopen.com

Boys' Singles